The twin cities of Hyderabad and Secunderabad in India have many churches of architectural value which were primarily built under British colonial rule, during the nineteenth and the early twentieth centuries. Although much smaller in size compared to Hyderabad, Secunderabad has far more churches than its twin, as a result of its being a British Cantonment under direct British rule, from its founding in 1806 to 1947. Most of the prominent churches in the twin cities are concentrated in and around the historic Clock Tower and Abids areas.  New and local churches are being established in and around the Twin cities.

Under the discipline of Church history these Churches are classified as,
 Roman Catholic Churches,
 Oriental Orthodox Churches,
 Protestant Churches,
 New and Indigenous Churches

Roman Catholic Churches

Oriental Orthodox Churches

Protestant Churches

New and Indigenous Churches

References

Hyderabad
Churches
 
Churches in Secunderabad
Secunderabad and Hyderabad
Churches in Secunderabad and Hyderabad